In mathematics, a Buekenhout geometry or diagram geometry is a generalization of projective spaces, Tits buildings,  and several other geometric structures, introduced by .

Definition

A Buekenhout geometry consists of a set  X whose elements are called "varieties",  with a symmetric reflexive relation on X called "incidence", together with a function τ called the "type map" from X to a set Δ whose elements are called "types" and whose size is called the "rank". Two distinct varieties of the same type cannot be incident.

A flag is a subset of X such that any two elements of the flag are incident. 
The Buekenhout geometry has to satisfy the following axiom:
Every flag is contained in a flag with exactly one variety of each type.

Example: X is the linear subspaces of a projective space with two subspaces incident if one is contained in the other,  Δ is the set of possible dimensions of linear subspaces, and the type map takes a linear subspace to its dimension. A flag in this case is a chain of subspaces, and each flag is contained in a so-called complete flag.

If F is a flag, the residue of F consists of all elements of X that are not in F but are incident with all elements of F. The residue of a flag forms a Buekenhout geometry in the obvious way, whose type are the types of X that are not types of F. A geometry is said to have some property residually if every residue of rank at least 2 has the property. In particular a geometry is called residually connected if every residue of rank at least 2 is connected (for the incidence relation).

Diagrams

The diagram of a Buekenhout geometry has a point for each type, and two points x, y are connected with a line labeled to indicate what sort of geometry the rank 2 residues of type {x,y} have as follows.
If the rank 2 residue is a digon, meaning any variety of type x is incident with every variety of type y, then the line from x to y is omitted. (This is the most common case.)
If the rank 2 residue is a projective plane, then the line from x to y is not labelled. This is the next most common case.
If the rank 2 residue is a more complicated geometry, the line is labelled by some symbol, which tends to vary from author to author.

References

External links

Incidence geometry
Group theory
Algebraic combinatorics
Geometric group theory